The France national under-21 speedway team is the national under-21 motorcycle speedway team of France and is controlled by the Finnish Motorcycling Federation. The team was withdrew from 2005 Under-21 World Cup and was nevert started in Under-21 World Cup.

Competition

Riders 
Riders who started in Individual Speedway Junior World Championship:

 Jeremy Diraison (2007)
 Gabriel Dubernard (2009)
 Maxime Mazeau (2008)
 Théo Di Palma (2008, 2009)
 Matthieu Tresarrieu (2007)

See also 
 France national speedway team
 France national under-19 speedway team

External links 
 (fr) Fédération Française de Motocyclisme webside

National speedway teams
Speedway
Speedway